Piotr Orliński (born 22 September 1976 in Poland) is a Polish retired footballer.

References

1976 births
Living people
Polish footballers
Association football midfielders
Świt Nowy Dwór Mazowiecki players
OKS Stomil Olsztyn players
FK Žalgiris players
Persib Bandung players
ŁKS Łódź players
Ruch Wysokie Mazowieckie players
ŁKS Łomża players
Footballers from Warsaw
Polish expatriate footballers
Expatriate footballers in Lithuania
Polish expatriate sportspeople in Lithuania
Expatriate footballers in Greece
Polish expatriate sportspeople in Greece
Expatriate footballers in Indonesia